The term Marine terminal may apply to:
 a berth (moorings)
 a dock (maritime)
 a ferry slip
 a ferry terminal
 a port
 a wharf

See also
 Terminal (disambiguation)